In numerical integration, Simpson's rules are several approximations for definite integrals, named after Thomas Simpson (1710–1761).

The most basic of these rules, called Simpson's 1/3 rule, or just Simpson's rule, reads

In German and some other languages, it is named after Johannes Kepler, who derived it in 1615 after seeing it used for wine barrels (barrel rule). The approximate equality in the rule becomes exact if  is a polynomial up to and including 3rd degree.

If the 1/3 rule is applied to n equal subdivisions of the integration range [a, b], one obtains the composite Simpson's 1/3 rule. Points inside the integration range are given alternating weights 4/3 and 2/3.

Simpson's 3/8 rule, also called Simpson's second rule, requires one more function evaluation inside the integration range and gives lower error bounds, but does not improve on order of the error.

If the 3/8 rule is applied to n equal subdivisions of the integration range [a, b], one obtains the composite Simpson's 3/8 rule.

Simpson's 1/3 and 3/8 rules are two special cases of closed Newton–Cotes formulas.

In naval architecture and ship stability estimation, there also exists Simpson's third rule, which has no special importance in general numerical analysis, see Simpson's rules (ship stability).

Simpson's 1/3 rule 
Simpson's 1/3 rule, also simply called Simpson's rule, is a method for numerical integration proposed by Thomas Simpson. It is based upon a quadratic interpolation. Simpson's 1/3 rule is as follows:

where  is the step size.

Simpson's rule gains an extra order because the points at which the integrand is evaluated are distributed symmetrically in the interval .

Another way to see this result is to note that any interpolating cubic polynomial can be expressed as the sum of the unique interpolating quadratic polynomial plus an arbitrarily scaled cubic polynomial that vanishes at all three points in the interval, and the integral of this second term vanishes because it is odd within the interval.

If the second derivative  exists and is convex in the interval , then

Derivations

Quadratic interpolation 
One can use Lagrange polynomial interpolation to find an expression for this polynomial,

Using integration by substitution, one can show that

Introducing the step size , this is also commonly written as

Because of the  factor, Simpson's rule is also referred to as "Simpson's 1/3 rule" (see below for generalization).

Averaging the midpoint and the trapezoidal rules 
Another derivation constructs Simpson's rule from two simpler approximations: the midpoint rule

and the trapezoidal rule

The errors in these approximations are

and

The two  terms are not equal; see Big O notation for more details. It follows from the above formulas for the errors of the midpoint and trapezoidal rule that the leading error term vanishes if we take the weighted average

This weighted average is exactly Simpson's rule.

Using another approximation (for example, the trapezoidal rule with twice as many points), it is possible to take a suitable weighted average and eliminate another error term. This is Romberg's method.

Undetermined coefficients 
The third derivation starts from the ansatz

The coefficients ,  and  can be fixed by requiring that this approximation be exact for all quadratic polynomials. This yields Simpson's rule. (This derivation is essentially a less rigorous version of the quadratic interpolation derivation, where one saves significant calculation effort by guessing the correct functional form.)

Composite Simpson's 1/3 rule 
If the interval of integration  is in some sense "small", then Simpson's rule with  subintervals will provide an adequate approximation to the exact integral. By "small" we mean that the function being integrated is relatively smooth over the interval . For such a function, a smooth quadratic interpolant like the one used in Simpson's rule will give good results.

However, it is often the case that the function we are trying to integrate is not smooth over the interval. Typically, this means that either the function is highly oscillatory or lacks derivatives at certain points. In these cases, Simpson's rule may give very poor results. One common way of handling this problem is by breaking up the interval  into  small subintervals. Simpson's rule is then applied to each subinterval, with the results being summed to produce an approximation for the integral over the entire interval. This sort of approach is termed the composite Simpson's 1/3 rule, or just composite Simpson's rule.

Suppose that the interval  is split up into  subintervals, with  an even number. Then, the composite Simpson's rule is given by

This composite rule with  corresponds with the regular Simpson's rule of the preceding section.

The error committed by the composite Simpson's rule is

The error is bounded (in absolute value) by

This formulation splits the interval  in subintervals of equal length. In practice, it is often advantageous to use subintervals of different lengths and concentrate the efforts on the places where the integrand is less well-behaved. This leads to the adaptive Simpson's method.

Simpson's 3/8 rule 
Simpson's 3/8 rule, also called Simpson's second rule, is another method for numerical integration proposed by Thomas Simpson. It is based upon a cubic interpolation rather than a quadratic interpolation. Simpson's 3/8 rule is as follows:

where  is the step size.

The error of this method is

Thus, the 3/8 rule is about twice as accurate as the standard method, but it uses one more function value. A composite 3/8 rule also exists, similarly as above.

A further generalization of this concept for interpolation with arbitrary-degree polynomials are the Newton–Cotes formulas.

Composite Simpson's 3/8 rule 

While the remainder for the rule is shown as

we can only use this if  is a multiple of three. The 1/3 rule can be used for the remaining subintervals without changing the order of the error term (conversely, the 3/8 rule can be used with a composite 1/3 rule for odd-numbered subintervals).

Alternative extended Simpson's rule 
This is another formulation of a composite Simpson's rule: instead of applying Simpson's rule to disjoint segments of the integral to be approximated, Simpson's rule is applied to overlapping segments, yielding

The formula above is obtained by combining the composite Simpson's 1/3 rule with the one consisting of using Simpson's 3/8 rule in the extreme subintervals and Simpson's 1/3 rule in the remaining subintervals. The result is then obtained by taking the mean of the two formulas.

Simpson's rules in the case of narrow peaks 
In the task of estimation of full area of narrow peak-like functions, Simpson's rules are much less efficient than trapezoidal rule. Namely, composite Simpson's 1/3 rule requires 1.8 times more points to achieve the same accuracy as trapezoidal rule. Composite Simpson's 3/8 rule is even less accurate. Integration by Simpson's 1/3 rule can be represented as a weighted average with 2/3 of the value coming from integration by the trapezoidal rule with step h and 1/3 of the value coming from integration by the rectangle rule with step 2h. The accuracy is governed by the second (2h step) term. Averaging of Simpson's 1/3 rule composite sums with properly shifted frames produces the following rules:

where two points outside of the integrated region are exploited, and 

where only points within integration region are used. Application of the second rule to the region of 3 points generates 1/3 Simpon's rule, 4 points - 3/8 rule.

These rules are very much similar to the alternative extended Simpson's rule. The coefficients within the major part of the region being integrated are one with non-unit coefficients only at the edges. These two rules can be associated with Euler–MacLaurin formula with the first derivative term and named First order Euler–MacLaurin integration rules. The two rules presented above differ only in the way how the first derivative at the region end is calculated. The first derivative term in the Euler–MacLaurin integration rules accounts for integral of the second derivative, which equals the difference of the first derivatives at the edges of the integration region. It is possible to generate higher order Euler–Maclaurin rules by adding a difference of 3rd, 5th, and so on derivatives with coefficients, as defined by Euler–MacLaurin formula.

Composite Simpson's rule for irregularly spaced data 
For some applications, the integration interval  needs to be divided into uneven intervals – perhaps due to uneven sampling of data, or missing or corrupted data points. Suppose we divide the interval  into even number  of subintervals of widths . Then the composite Simpson's rule is given by

where

are the function values at the th sampling point on the interval .

In case of odd number  of subintervals, the above formula are used up to the second to last interval, 
and the last interval is handled separately by adding the following to the result:

where

See also 
 Newton–Cotes formulas
 Gaussian quadrature

Notes

References

External links 
 
 
 Simpson's 1/3rd rule of integration — Notes, PPT, Mathcad, Matlab, Mathematica, Maple at Numerical Methods for STEM undergraduate
 A detailed description of a computer implementation is described by Dorai Sitaram in Teach Yourself Scheme in Fixnum Days, Appendix C

Integral calculus
Numerical integration (quadrature)
Numerical analysis
Articles with example Python (programming language) code
Articles with example R code